North Carolina Highway 119 (NC 119) is a primary state highway in the U.S. state of North Carolina.

Route description
It runs from NC 54 in Swepsonville north via Mebane, Hightowers, and Semora to the Virginia state line, where it continues as State Route 119.

History
Established in 1940, NC 119 was a renumbering of NC 103 between NC 54 and NC 49, in Alamance County. In 1954, NC 119 was extended north, on new primary routing, to the Virginia border. In 1964, Virginia reciprocated by establishing SR 119 from the state line north to US 58/US 360.

The North Carolina Department of Transportation has long planned to reroute the highway, currently running through central Mebane, to a new alignment further west. However, in 1998 and 1999, civil rights complaints were filed by the West End Revitalization Association and other local residents against the Department of Transportation and city government over concerns about disproportionate impacts on predominantly African-American communities along the proposed route and longstanding dissatisfaction with access to municipal services. Although a four-year moratorium on the project was established in 1999, the Federal Highway Administration eventually granted approval in December 2009.

A project that started in 1990 relocated NC 119 west of Mebane, creating a new 4 to 6-lane divided highway from I-40/I-85 to Mrs. White Lane (SR 1918).  The project was broken into two parts, with a combined estimate of $101.9 million; property acquisitions were expected after 2014. The relocated alignment opened to traffic on May 27, 2022.

Junction list

See also
North Carolina Bicycle Route 4 - Concurrent with NC 119 from Stephentown Road to Osmond Road near Hyco Lake

References

External links

NCRoads.com: N.C. 119

119
Transportation in Alamance County, North Carolina
Transportation in Caswell County, North Carolina